The 102d Security Forces Squadron (102 SFS) is a unit of the 102d Intelligence Wing, Massachusetts Air National Guard, at Otis Air National Guard Base, Joint Base Cape Cod, Massachusetts. If activated to federal service, the squadron is gained by the United States Air Force.

As an Air National Guard unit, the 102d Security Forces Squadron is not in the normal United States Air Force chain of command and is under the jurisdiction of the Massachusetts Air National Guard unless activated to federal service by order of the President of the United States.

History

References

See also 

 United States Air Force Security Forces
 Massachusetts Air National Guard

Military units and formations in Massachusetts
United States Air National Guard